The Churchill County Courthouse, at 10 Williams St. in Fallon, Nevada, was erected in 1903.  It was designed by Reno, Nevada, architect Ben Leon in Classical Revival style, including a monumental portico with two pairs of columns having Ionic capitals.  It served as the county courthouse until 1973 and then was used for offices.

It is significant as "one of the most substantial buildings in Churchill County" and as one of only two surviving frame courthouses in Nevada.

It was listed on the National Register of Historic Places in 1992.

References 

Neoclassical architecture in Nevada
Government buildings completed in 1903
Courthouses on the National Register of Historic Places in Nevada
National Register of Historic Places in Churchill County, Nevada